Archepandemis is a genus of moths in the tribe Archipini. The genus is treated as a synonym of Pandemis by some authors.

Species
Archepandemis borealis (Freeman, 1965)
Archepandemis coniferana Mutuura, 1978
Archepandemis morrisana Mutuura, 1978

See also
List of Tortricidae genera

References

 , 2005: World Catalogue of Insects volume 5 Tortricidae.
 , 1978, The Canadian Entomologist 110: 569.

External links
tortricidae.com

Archipini
Tortricidae genera
Taxa named by Akira Mutuura